Antonovka is a rural locality (a village) in Yefremkinsky Selsoviet, Karmaskalinsky District, Bashkortostan, Russia. The population was 238 as of 2010. There are 3 streets.

Geography 
Antonovka is located 21 km south of Karmaskaly (the district's administrative centre) by road. Mursyakovo is the nearest rural locality.

References 

Rural localities in Karmaskalinsky District